Tharwat El-Bendary (original name: ثروت البنداري, born ) is an Egyptian male weightlifter, competing in the 105 kg category and representing Egypt at international competitions. He participated at the 1996 Summer Olympics in the 99 kg event. He competed at world championships, most recently at the 1999 World Weightlifting Championships.

Major results

References

External links
 

1970 births
Living people
Egyptian male weightlifters
Weightlifters at the 1996 Summer Olympics
Olympic weightlifters of Egypt
Place of birth missing (living people)